CosmicOS is a self-contained message designed to be understood primarily by treating it as a computer program and executing it.  It is inspired by Hans Freudenthal's Lincos and resembles the programming language Scheme in many ways.

The message is written with only four basic symbols representing the binary digits one and zero and open and close brackets. Numbers are represented as a string of binary digits between a pair of brackets and expressions are represented as a string of numbers between brackets. Identifiers for operations are arbitrarily assigned numbers and their functions can be defined within the message itself.

Self-contained messages are of interest for CETI research, but there is much difference of opinion over the most appropriate encoding and broadcast medium to use.  CosmicOS is released in modular form, so that the basic message can be adapted to a particular concrete instantiation. The message is released under the GPL licence.

See also
 Hello world

External links
CosmicOS project
old CosmicOS project page

Interstellar messages
Engineered languages
Knowledge representation languages